David Gilman (born December 6, 1954) is an American luger and sprint canoer who competed in the late 1970s and early 1980s. As a sprint canoer, he was eliminated in the semifinals of the K-1 1000 m event at the 1976 Summer Olympics in Montreal. Eight years later in Los Angeles, Gilman was eliminated in the repechages of the K-4 1000 m event.

Gilman also finished 17th in the men's singles luge event at the 1984 Winter Olympics in Sarajevo.

References
Sports-reference.com profile

1954 births
American male canoeists
American male lugers
Canoeists at the 1976 Summer Olympics
Canoeists at the 1984 Summer Olympics
Living people
Lugers at the 1984 Winter Olympics
Olympic canoeists of the United States
Olympic lugers of the United States